The Employment Court of New Zealand (Māori: Te Kooti Take-a-mihi o Aotearoa) is a specialist court for employment disputes. It mainly deals with issues arising under the Employment Relations Act 2000. The Employment Court is a court of record and has equal standing to the High Court of New Zealand.

History
The Court of Arbitration was a specialist employment court in New Zealand that dealt with industrial relations disputes from 1894 to 1973.

The Industrial Conciliation and Arbitration Act 1894 created a compulsory arbitration system for resolving industrial disputes. Part of this involved the creation of the Court of Arbitration. The court heard industrial disputes, made and interpreted awards, and set minimum standards of employment. The court also had the power to set and adjust wages. The court comprised a Supreme Court Judge, a union representative, and an employers' representative.

These elements continued through a number of successive acts until repeal in 1973.

The Employment Contracts Act 1991 established the Employment Court to deal with employment disputes.

Chief judge
The following is a list of the chief judges of the Employment Court since it was established in 1991.

References

New Zealand court system
New Zealand labour law
Arbitration courts and tribunals
1894 establishments in New Zealand
1973 disestablishments
Courts and tribunals established in 1894
Courts and tribunals disestablished in 1973
1991 establishments in New Zealand
Courts and tribunals established in 1991